Samka was a Shan state in the Central Division of the Southern Shan States in what is today Burma.

References

19th century in Burma
Shan States